Cheating Cheaters may refer to:

 Cheating Cheaters (play), a 1916 Broadway play by Max Marcin, and three film adaptations of the play:
 Cheating Cheaters (1919 film)
 Cheating Cheaters (1927 film)
 Cheating Cheaters (1934 film)